Events from the year 1833 in France.

Incumbents
 Monarch – Louis Philippe I

Events
28 June - Law promulgated by François Guizot requires every commune or municipality to maintain a public primary school.
1 December - Launch of Le Ménestrel, a weekly music journal; it survives until 1940.

Births
12 February - Charles-Wilfrid de Bériot, pianist, teacher and composer (died 1914)
4 March - Antoine Alphonse Chassepot, gunsmith and inventor (died 1905)
17 April - Arthur Arnould, anarchist (died 1895)
20 August - Gustave Denis, industrialist (died 1925)
8 October - André Theuriet, poet and novelist (died 1907)

Deaths
12 January - Marie-Antoine Carême, chef (born 1784) 
19 January - Ferdinand Hérold, composer (born 1791)
3 February - Henri François Delaborde, general (born 1764)
27 March - Louis Fursy Henri Compère, soldier (born 1768)
10 May - François Andrieux, dramatist (born 1759)
5 July - Nicéphore Niépce, inventor, pioneer photographer (born 1765)
6 July - Pierre-Narcisse Guérin, painter (born 1774)
3 October - François, marquis de Chasseloup-Laubat, general and military engineer (born 1754)
17 October - François-Isidore Gagelin, missionary (born 1799)

References

1830s in France